The Loch of Bosquoy is a small, shallow, rhomboid shaped loch on Mainland, Orkney, Scotland situated just off the north east corner of the Loch of Harray. The loch was surveyed during 1903 by Sir John Murray and later charted  as part of The Bathymetrical Survey of Fresh-Water Lochs of Scotland 1897–1909.

References

Bosquoy
Bosquoy
Bosquoy
Mainland, Orkney